Seipel is a surname. Notable people with the surname include:

Ignaz Seipel (1876–1932), Austrian Roman Catholic priest and politician
Joseph H. Seipel, American sculptor and conceptual artist
Mike Seipel (born 1960), American competitive barefoot water skier
Susan Seipel (born 1986), Australian Para-canoeist